Gillian Rubinstein (born 29 August 1942) is an English-born children's author and playwright. Born in Potten End, Berkhamsted, Hertfordshire, England, Rubinstein split her childhood between England and Nigeria, moving to Australia in 1973. As well as eight plays, numerous short stories and articles, she has written over 30 books. Her award-winning and hugely popular 1986 debut Space Demons introduced the themes of growing up and fantasy worlds which emerge often in her other writings. Books such as At Ardilla, Foxspell and Galax-Arena all received critical acclaim and multiple awards.

In 2001, Rubinstein published Across the Nightingale Floor, the first of the best-selling three-book series Tales of the Otori series under the pseudonym Lian Hearn. The series is set in a fictional island nation resembling feudal Japan and is her first work to reach an adult audience.

The name  'Lian', comes from a childhood nickname and  'Hearn' apparently refers to herons which are a prominent theme in the series. It has also been suggested that the surname is most likely borrowed from Lafcadio Hearn; one of the first Western writers to tackle Japanese mythology.

Gillian Rubinstein currently resides in Mullumbimby, New South Wales.

Works

Writing as Gillian Rubinstein 
 Space Demons (1987)	
 Beyond the Labyrinth (1988)
 Skymaze (1989)
 Answers to Brut (Omnibus Books, 1991)
 Galax-Arena (Hyland House, 1992) (2nd edition 2001)	
 Mr Plunkett's pool (Random House Australia, 1992), illustrated by Terry Denton
 Keep Me Company (Viking, 1992), illustrated by Lorraine Hannay
 Dog in, Cat Out (Ticknor & Fields, 1993), illustrated by Ann James
 Foxspell (Hyland House, 1994)	
 Jake and Pete (Random House Australia, 1995), illustrated by Terry Denton
 The Giant's Tooth (Puffin, 1995), illustrated by Craig Smith
 Peanut the ponyrat (Heinemann, 1995)	
 Annie's Brother's Suit (Hyland House, 1996)	
 Witch Music and other stories (Hyland House, 1996)	
 Shinkei (Omnibus Books, 1996)	
 Sharon, keep your hair on (Random House Australia, 1996), illustrated by David Mackintosh
 Under the Cat's Eye (Hodder Headline, 1997)	
 Jake and Pete and the stray dogs Random House Australia, 1997), illustrated by Terry Denton
 Each beach (Box Press, 1998) illustrations by Mark Sofilas	
 Hooray for the Kafe Karaoke (Random House Australia, 1998), pictures by David Mackintosh
 The Pirates' Ship (Puffin Books, 1998), illustrated by Craig Smith
 The Fairy's Wings (Puffin Books, 1998), illustrated by Craig Smith
 Pure Chance (Walker Books, 1998), illustrations by Caroline Binch
 Ducky's nest (Random House Australia, 1999), illustrated by Terry Denton
 The Mermaid of Bondi Beach (Hodder Children's Books, 1999), illustrated by Anna Pignataro
 Jake & Pete and the Catcrowbats (Random House Australia, 1999), illustrated by Terry Denton
 Jake and Pete and the magpie's wedding (Random House Australia, 2000), with Terry Denton
 Terra-Farma (Viking, 2001)
 Prue Theroux : the cool librarian (Random House Australia, 2001), illustrated by David Mackintosh
 The Whale's Child (Hodder Headline Australia, 2002)

Writing as Lian Hearn

Tales of the Otori
 Across the Nightingale Floor (2002)
 Grass for His Pillow (2003)
 Brilliance of the Moon (2004)
 The Harsh Cry of the Heron (2006)
 Heaven's Net is Wide (2007)
"His Kikuta Hands" (2016), short story expanding on a scene in Brilliance of the Moon

Children of the Otori
 Orphan Warriors (2020)	
 Sibling Assassins (2020)	
"Wine, Knife, Sword - A Tale from the Eight Islands" (2018, free ebook), short story, background to Orphan Warriors

The Tale of Shikanoko
 Emperor of the Eight Islands (April 2016)
 Autumn Princess, Dragon Child (June 2016)
 Lord of the Darkwood (August 2016)
 The Tengu's Game of Go (September 2016)
The Tale of Shikanoko series is set in the Otori universe, several centuries prior to the Tales of the Otori.

Standalone novels 
The Storyteller and His Three Daughters (2013)
Blossoms and Shadows (2014)

Writing as G.M. Hanson

"See Nikko and Die", story in Love Lies Bleeding, edited by Jennifer Rowe

Compilation edited by Gillian Rubinstein
 After Dark: Seven Tales to Read at Night (Omnibus/Puffin, 1988)	
 Before Dawn: More Tales to Read at Night (Omnibus/Puffin, 1988)

Contributions
 New introduction as Lian Hearn for Japan and Her People, by Anna Hartshorne, Jetlag Press, 2007. Edited by Brent Massey and Christopher E. West.

Awards  
Children's Peace Literature Award 1987
Deutscher Jugendliteraturpreis 2004

References

External links
Gillian Rubinstein (official)
Lian Hearn (official)
GIllian Rubinstein at AustLit

Lian Hearn at publisher Macmillan
 , and at WorldCat
 Lian Hearn at LC Authorities and at WorldCat

1942 births
English children's writers
English emigrants to Australia
English women writers
Writers from South Australia
Living people
British expatriates in Nigeria
People from Goolwa, South Australia